The 1979 Avon Championships of Dallas was a women's tennis tournament played on indoor carpet courts at the Moody Coliseum in Dallas, Texas that was part of the 1979 Virginia Slims World Championship Series. It was the eighth edition of the tournament, held from February 26 through March 4, 1979. Top-seeded Martina Navratilova won the singles title and earned $35,000 first-prize money.<

Finals

Singles
 Martina Navratilova defeated  Chris Evert 6–4, 6–4
 It was Navratilova's fourth singles title of the year and the 28th of her career.

Doubles
 Martina Navratilova /  Anne Smith defeated  Rosie Casals /  Chris Evert 7–6, 6–2

Prize money

See also
 Evert–Navratilova rivalry

References

External links
 Women's Tennis Association (WTA) tournament edition details
 International Tennis Federation (ITF) tournament edition details

Avon Championships of Dallas
Virginia Slims of Dallas
Avon Championships of Dallas
Dallas
Dallas
Avon Championships of Dallas
Avon Championships of Dallas